Nicole Schnyder-Benoit (born March 13, 1973 in Magglingen) is a retired professional beach volleyball player from Switzerland, who represented her native country at the 2004 Summer Olympics in Athens, Greece. Partnering Simone Kuhn she claimed the gold medal at the 2004 European Championships in Timmendorfer Strand, Germany. Schnyder-Benoit is married and mother of 2 boys.

Playing partners
 Simone Kuhn
 Magi Schlaefli
 Annalea Hartmann
 Nadia Erni
 Sandra Bratschi
 Franziska Frei
 Patricia Dormann

References

External links 
 Team Kuhn/Schnyder-Benoit
 
 

1973 births
Living people
Swiss beach volleyball players
Women's beach volleyball players
Olympic beach volleyball players of Switzerland
Beach volleyball players at the 2004 Summer Olympics